World Bowl I could refer to:

World Bowl (WFL), the first (and only) championship game of the World Football League (held in 1974)
World Bowl '91, the first annual championship game of the World League of American Football (held in 1991)